Louis Charles Alphonse Angers (1854 – March 11, 1929) was a Canadian politician.

Angers was born in La Malbaie, Canada East, the son of Elie Angers, a blacksmith, and Marie Perron. He was educated at Laval Normal School. A lawyer by profession, Angers was first elected to the House of Commons of Canada in a January 1896 by-election in the riding of Charlevoix as a Liberal. He was re-elected in the 1896 and 1900 general elections. He was defeated in 1904.

References

External links
 

Liberal Party of Canada MPs
Members of the House of Commons of Canada from Quebec
1854 births
1929 deaths